Lauricocha is a small parish in the central Andean highlands of Perú.

The parish consists of half a dozen houses, scattered at an elevation of 3,850 m in a sparsely populated area near the village of Antacolpa, and 25 km northwest of Yanahuanca, the capital of the province of Daniel Alcides Carrión.

25 km west of the parish there is Cerro Yerupajá (6,634 m) which is the highest mountain in the Cordillera Huayhuash and among the ten highest summits in South America.

Populated places in the Huánuco Region